Damon Jamal Gupton (born January 4, 1973) is an American actor and orchestral conductor, best known for his series regular roles as Charles Foster on Deadline, Evrard Velerio on Prime Suspect, Adam Page on The Divide, Detective Cal Brown on The Player, Deputy Chief Henderson on Black Lightning, and SSA Stephen Walker on Criminal Minds. He has also co-starred in the films The Last Airbender (2010), Whiplash (2014), and La La Land (2016).

Early life and education
Gupton was born in Detroit, Michigan. He attended the University of Michigan, where he directed a musical ensemble, and graduated with a bachelor's degree in Music Education. He received the Emerging Artist Award from the University's School of Music, Theatre & Dance Alumni Society. He also graduated in drama from Juilliard School in New York. Gupton studied conducting at the Aspen Music Festival and School with David Zinman and Murry Sidlin. He later attended the National Conducting Institute in Washington, D.C., studying with Leonard Slatkin.

Career
Gupton's first film appearance was in the drama Unfaithful (2002).

In 2004, he was an American Conducting Fellow at the Houston Symphony, and was assistant conductor of the Kansas City Symphony in 2006. Gupton was a guest conductor with various orchestras, including the Cincinnati Pops, Cleveland Orchestra, National Symphony Orchestra, Detroit Symphony, Baltimore Symphony, San Diego Symphony, San Antonio Symphony, Princeton Symphony Orchestra, as well as Monte Carlo Philharmonic Orchestra, the NHK Orchestra of Tokyo, and the Orquesta Filarmonica de UNAM. He was the conductor of the Sphinx Chamber Orchestra during its national tour, including performances at Carnegie Hall. Gupton won Mexico City's third International Eduardo Mata Conducting Competition, the Robert J. Harth Conducting Prize, and The Aspen Conducting Prize. He was named a Presidential Professor by the University of Michigan in January 2009.

In 2012, Gupton performed in the Broadway production of the play Clybourne Park, receiving an AUDELCO nomination for Best Supporting Actor. In September 2012, Gupton landed the lead role on the short-lived AMC drama series The Divide, playing District Attorney Adam Page. Gupton joined the cast of the NBC procedural drama series The Player in February 2015, co-starring as Detective Cal Brown alongside Wesley Snipes. On December 3, 2015, he was cast in the recurring role of psychiatrist Gregg Edwards on the fourth season of A&E's drama-thriller series Bates Motel.

On September 30, 2016, CBS announced that Gupton had joined Criminal Minds as a regular cast member, portraying Stephen Walker, a special agent in the Behavioral Analysis Unit. He began appearing in the series' twelfth season. On June 11, 2017, it was announced that he would depart the show after one season. Gupton was subsequently cast as Inspector Henderson in the superhero drama series Black Lightning.

Filmography

Film

Television

References

External links
 
 
 
 

1973 births
University of Detroit Jesuit High School and Academy alumni
20th-century American male actors
21st-century American male actors
21st-century American conductors (music)
African-American conductors (music)
American male film actors
American male television actors
American male conductors (music)
Living people
Male actors from Detroit
University of Michigan School of Music, Theatre & Dance alumni
21st-century American male musicians
20th-century African-American people
21st-century African-American musicians